Already Gone may refer to:
Already Gone (film), a 2019 American film
Already Gone (album), by Kristy Hanson
"Already Gone" (Eagles song), 1974
"Already Gone" (Powderfinger song), 1998
"Already Gone" (Melanie C song), 2007
"Already Gone" (Sugarland song), 2008
"Already Gone" (Kelly Clarkson song), 2009
"Already Gone" (Taylor Henderson song), 2014
"Already Gone", a song by Disturbed from Evolution
"Already Gone", a song by Alvvays from Antisocialites
"Already Gone", a song by Puddle of Mudd from Life on Display
"Already Gone", a song by Stone Temple Pilots from their 2018 same-titled album
"Already Gone", a song by Crossfade from Falling Away